Christopher Neil Ballard (born 10 October 1958) is a British sprint canoer who competed in the early to mid-1980s. At the 1980 Summer Olympics in Moscow, he was eliminated in the semifinals of both the K-2 500 m and the K-2 1000 m events.

References
Sports-Reference.com profile

1958 births
Canoeists at the 1980 Summer Olympics
Living people
Olympic canoeists of Great Britain
British male canoeists